'''Henry Ford II High School is a public high school located in the Metropolitan Detroit region in the city of Sterling Heights, Michigan, United States.  It is a part of Utica Community Schools.

In 2004 Ford was recognized as a Michigan Blue Ribbon Exemplary School.

History
This school is named after Henry Ford II, the executive officer of the Ford Motor Co.  He was also a member of the New Detroit, Inc., Detroit Renaissance and a former chairman of the National Alliance of Businessmen. Ground was broken for HFII in 1971. Ford II opened with students in the fall of 1973. Ford II's inaugural graduating class of 1975 attended Eisenhower High School (Michigan) before coming to Ford II. The original design of the school had an open concept. The school had few windows and no walls in the individual wings. This open concept failed, as multiple classes could be heard at the same time. The building was quickly segmented into its current classroom structure. Today, the surrounding area is largely suburban (a part of Metro Detroit) and has subdivisions and strip-malls within the school's immediate proximity, most notably Lakeside Mall.

Notable alumni
 Brad Jones, NHL hockey player 
 Randy Farmer, game developer
 Craig Krenzel, NFL football player

References

External links
 

Public high schools in Michigan
Educational institutions established in 1972
Schools in Macomb County, Michigan
1972 establishments in Michigan
Sterling Heights, Michigan